It Was Not in Vain is a 1957 Yugoslavian drama film directed by Nikola Tanhofer. It was entered into the 7th Berlin International Film Festival.

Cast
 Boris Buzančić
 Mira Nikolić
 Mia Oremović
 Zlata Perlić
 Zvonimir Rogoz
 Vjera Simić
 Ivan Šubić
 Ljuba Tadić (as Ljubo Tadić)
 Antun Vrdoljak
 Mladen Šerment

References

External links

1957 films
1957 drama films
Serbo-Croatian-language films
Yugoslav black-and-white films
Films directed by Nikola Tanhofer
Jadran Film films
1957 directorial debut films
Yugoslav drama films
Films set in Yugoslavia